The 2017 Campeonato Paulista de Futebol Profissional da Primeira Divisão - Série A1 was the 116th season of São Paulo's top professional football league.

Format
In the first stage the sixteen teams are drawn, with seeding, into four groups of four teams each, with each team playing once against the twelve clubs from the other three groups. After each team has played twelve matches, the top two teams of each group qualify for the quarter-final stage.
After the completion of the first stage, the two clubs with the lowest number of points, regardless of the group, will be relegated to the Campeonato Paulista Série A2.
Quarter-finals, semi-finals and finals are played in a two-legged home and away fixture, with the best placed first stage team playing the second leg at home.
In case of a draw in any knockout stage, the match will be decided by a penalty shoot-out.

Tiebreakers
The teams are ranked according to points (3 points for a win, 1 point for a draw, 0 points for a loss). If two or more teams are equal on points on completion of the group matches, the following criteria are applied to determine the rankings:
Higher number of wins;
Superior goal difference;
Higher number of goals scored;
Fewest red cards received;
Fewest yellow cards received;
Draw in the headquarters of the FPF.

Teams

Source: Futebol Paulista

First stage

Group A

Group B

Group C

Group D

Knockout stage

Bracket

General table

Top scorers

Awards

Team of the year

Player of the Season
The Player of the Year was awarded to William Pottker.

Young Player of the Season
The Young Player of the Year was awarded to Clayson.

Countryside Best Player of the Season
The Countryside Best Player of the Year was awarded to William Pottker.

Top scorer of the Season
The top scorer of the season was Gilberto and William Pottker, who scored nine goals each.

References

External links

Campeonato Paulista seasons
Sao Paulo